The Cameroon national basketball team (French: Équipe nationale de basketball de Camerounaise) represents Cameroon in men's international competitions. It is administered by the Fédération Camerounaise de Basketball.

Once an only average team, Cameroon has turned into a major force and contender for the title of the African Basketball Championship. Their best achievement was reaching the Silver Medal in 2007. Since the late 2000s, the team has competed well against non-African competition, too.

Competitive record

AfroBasket

FIBA Basketball World Cup 
Since 2019, FIBA organises qualification tournaments for African teams in order to qualify for the FIBA Basketball World Cup.

Team

Current roster
Roster in the 2023 FIBA World Cup qualifiers of August 27, 2022.

Head coach position
 Lazare Adingono: (2007–2011)
 Michel Perrin: (2013)
Lazare Adingono: (2021)

Notable Cameroonian players
The following notable Cameroonian players are also eligible to represent the country in FIBA competitions:

 Joel Embiid (born 1994, C) – Player for the Philadelphia 76ers who also holds the French nationality.
 Pascal Siakam (born 1994, F) – Player for the Toronto Raptors.
 Luc Mbah a Moute (born 1986, F) – Player for the Milwaukee Bucks.
 Christian Koloko (born 2000, C) – Player for the Toronto Raptors.

References

External links

FIBA profile
Cameroon Basketball Records at FIBA Archive
Afrobasket – Cameroon Men National Team

Men's national basketball teams
Basketball
Basketball in Cameroon
1965 establishments in Cameroon